Prostanthera violacea, commonly known as violet mint-bush, is a species of flowering plant in the family Lamiaceae and is endemic to south-eastern New South Wales. It is a slender, strongly aromatic shrub with densely hairy branches, more or less round leaves with the edges rolled under and mauve to bluish flowers often with white tips.

Description
The leaves are more or less round but usually appear egg-shaped because the edges are rolled under. Flowering occurs in spring.

Taxonomy
Prostanthera violacea was formally described in 1810 by Robert Brown in his treatise Prodromus Florae Novae Hollandiae et Insulae Van Diemen.

Distribution and habitat
Violet mint-bush grows in forest, including rainforest, often in gullies or near watercourses, and is found on the coast and tablelands of south-eastern New South Wales.

References

violacea
Flora of New South Wales
Lamiales of Australia
Plants described in 1810
Taxa named by Robert Brown (botanist, born 1773)